The following is a list of fictional United States presidents, I through J.

I

President Ingstrom
 President in: Freedom (TV series)
 A war breaks out in the Middle East during his term.
 Ingstrom disappears after Air Force One crashes, causing a military government to form in the United States.

President Itchy
 President in: Itchy and Scratchy (The Simpsons Movie)
 After Itchy returns home from the moon, he is regarded as a hero and is elected president in 2008.
 Hillary Clinton was his vice president.

J

President Jackson
 President in: Lash-Up (novel, 2015) by Larry Bond
 President 2017 during war with China in which US military is hampered by Chinese destruction of GPS satellites.
 Establishes United States Space Force to defend American space assets.
 Party: Democratic

President Lucas Jacobs
 President in: Independence Day: Crucible, tie-in novel bridging Independence Day and Independence Day: Resurgence
 44th President of the United States who served from 2005 to 2013, succeeding William Grey.
 Former senator and United States Army lieutenant general.
 Succeeded by his own Vice President Elizabeth Lanford.
 First African-American to be elected president.

President Lee Alexander James
 President in: Dead Heat (novel) by Joel C. Rosenberg
 Was Vice President under President William Harvard Oaks before becoming the president after Oaks is assassinated by his aide in NORAD. James was formerly the Secretary of Homeland Security.

President Bruce Jansen
 President in: The Washington Decree (novel, 2006) by Jussi Adler-Olsen
 Former governor and senator of Virginia.
 He becomes mentally unstable after his second wife, First Lady Mimi Todd Jansen, is assassinated shortly after his inauguration.
 Proposes the Washington Decrees—a series of laws that allow the expansion of public surveillance, media control, and restrictions of personal freedom rights of the American people under the First Amendment.
 Turns the United States into a dictatorship, before a military coup causes a new Civil War and he is brought down by the members of his own government.
 Is replaced by his vice president, Michael T. Lerner.

President William Jarman
 President in: Shadowrun
 Presidential terms: 2017–2021, 2021–2025, and 2025–2029.
 46th US President. 
 Served as vice president under President Jesse Garrety.
 Sworn in as President after Garrety's assassination 100 days before the end of his second term. Jarman's first term was 100 days longer than normal as he replaced Garrety after the latter's assassination.
 Term limits are repealed by the 29th Amendment during Jarman's second term.
 Defeated in 2030 election by Andrew McAlister.

President Raymond Jarvis
 President in: The Event (TV series)
 Was vice president under President Elias Martinez and becomes acting president under the terms of the 25th Amendment after he slips poison into Martinez's coffee under orders from the extraterrestrials' leader.
 Played by Bill Smitrovich

President Edward Montoya Jason
 President in: Come Nineveh, Come Tyre (novel) by Allen Drury
 Early in his administration, the United States government is overthrown by a Soviet conspiracy, mostly because of Jason's naivete and incompetence.
 Commits suicide when the consequences of his actions become clear.

President Theodore "Teddy" Jay
 President in: Father's Day (novel, 1994) by John Calvin Batchlor
 Former governor from Michigan, elected in 2000
 Steps down under the 25th Amendment after suffering a nervous breakdown in 2002.
 After learning his Vice President T. E. Garland is plotting a military coup against him, he suffers a stroke while swimming.
 Party: Democratic

Censor Jennings
 President in: A Different Flesh (short stories) by Harry Turtledove
 In an alternate timeline where Homo erectus (called "sims") and megafauna from the Pleistocene era survived in the Western Hemisphere, Britain's American colonies seceded earlier in 1738 to form the Federated Commonwealths of America. The constitution of the Federated Commonwealths is modelled more on the Roman Republic than that of the real-life United States, with the country being governed by two chief executives (censors) who can veto each other as well as life-long-serving senators.
 Serving as one of the two censors in 1988, Jennings vetoes Censor Bryan's order of an investigation into the handling of a riot by sims' rights activists protesting the use of sims in HIV research.

President James Johnson
 President in: Metal Gear Solid 2: Sons of Liberty
 The 44th President, preceded by President George Sears (Solidus Snake). After Sears "resigns" after the events of Metal Gear Solid, James Johnson, the son of a former senator, is nominated for election and won; Johnson claims the election was a farce and that he is a figurehead for The Patriots, a secret group that controls the United States and decides the elections. During the events of the Plant chapter, Johnson is assassinated by Revolver Ocelot for his unwilling involvement in the S3 Plan.

President William Johnson
 President in: The First Family (TV series)
 The 45th president, and the second African-American to hold the office
 Played by: Christopher B. Duncan

President Arthur Jones
 President in: The Case of the President (novel) by Marc Elsberg
 During his re-election campaign, his predecessor Douglas Turner is arrested in Athens, Greece, by the International Criminal Court (ICC) for committing illegal drone strikes in Syria.
 Not wanting a scandal to hurt his chances for a second term, Jones makes threats against the ICC and all member states of the European Union to prevent Turner from being convicted.
 Instructs his intelligence services to find and eliminate the most important witness in the case, an anonymous whistleblower.

President Rufus Jones
 President in: Rufus Jones for President (movie, 1933)
 Played by: Sammy Davis Jr.

President Maria Juarez
 President in: The Light of Other Days
 She is the first female President of the United States.
 Presidential term 2037–2041.
 Her party is accused of "playing dirty tricks" against Juarez's party headquarters.

References

Lists of fictional presidents of the United States